Lafayette Sharkey Winham (October 23, 1881 in Brooklyn, New York – September 12, 1951 in Brooklyn, New York), nicknamed "Lefty", was a professional baseball pitcher. He pitched in six games in Major League Baseball for the 1902 Brooklyn Superbas and 1903 Pittsburgh Pirates.

Winham appeared in five games for the Pirates team that went on to lose the first World Series, in which he did not appear. That season, he pitched a six inning shutout against the Philadelphia Phillies at Columbia Park in Philadelphia.

At the minor league level, Lafayette pitched for the Montreal Royals in 1903.

References

External links

Lave Winham at Baseball Almanac

Major League Baseball pitchers
Brooklyn Superbas players
Pittsburgh Pirates players
Montreal Royals players
Worcester Riddlers players
Baseball players from New York (state)
Sportspeople from Brooklyn
Baseball players from New York City
1881 births
1951 deaths
Burials at the Cemetery of the Evergreens